Leo Ignatius Bohen (September 30, 1890 – April 8, 1942) was an American Major League Baseball pitcher. He started one game for the Philadelphia Athletics during the  season and made one relief appearance for the Pittsburgh Pirates during the  season.

References

1890 births
1942 deaths
Major League Baseball pitchers
Philadelphia Athletics players
Pittsburgh Pirates players
Baseball players from Iowa
Oakland Oaks (baseball) players
Helena Senators players
Missoula (minor league baseball) players
Reading Pretzels players
Peoria Distillers players
Moline Plowboys players
People from Pottawattamie County, Iowa